Norbert Szendrei (born 27 March 2000) is a Hungarian football player who plays for Zalaegerszeg.

Career

Honvéd
On 27 May 2018, Szendrei played his first match for Budapest Honvéd in a 0-2 loss against Videoton in the Hungarian League.

Fehérvár
On 19 July 2021, after 10 years at Budapest Honvéd, Szendrei was transferred to Fehérvár.

Zalaegerszeg
On 1 July 2022, Szendrei joined Zalaegerszeg on a four-year contract.

Club statistics

Updated to games played as of 15 May 2022.

Honours
Honvéd
Hungarian Cup: 2019-20

References

External links
 
 

2000 births
People from Nyíregyháza
Sportspeople from Szabolcs-Szatmár-Bereg County
Living people
Hungarian footballers
Hungary youth international footballers
Hungary under-21 international footballers
Association football forwards
Budapest Honvéd FC players
Fehérvár FC players
Zalaegerszegi TE players
Nemzeti Bajnokság I players